KDNW (97.3 FM, "Life 97.3") is a contemporary Christian music radio station located in Duluth, Minnesota, owned and operated by Northwestern Media, a ministry of the University of Northwestern-St. Paul, a Christian university in Roseville, Minnesota.

KDNW is a non-profit radio station, receiving most of its donations and contributions from its listeners. The station is also rebroadcast on several translators (low-powered rebroadcasters) outside of its main listening area.

Translators

External links
KDNW official website

Contemporary Christian radio stations in the United States
Radio stations in Duluth, Minnesota
Radio stations established in 1993
1993 establishments in Minnesota
Northwestern Media
Christian radio stations in Minnesota